{{DISPLAYTITLE:C6H4O4}}
The molecular formula C6H4O4 may refer to:
Coumalic acid
Dihydroxybenzoquinones
2,3-Dihydroxy-1,4-benzoquinone 
2,5-Dihydroxy-1,4-benzoquinone 
2,6-Dihydroxy-1,4-benzoquinone 
3,4-Dihydroxy-1,2-benzoquinone 
3,5-Dihydroxy-1,2-benzoquinone 
3,6-Dihydroxy-1,2-benzoquinone 
4,5-Dihydroxy-1,2-benzoquinone 
5-Carboxyfurfuraldehyde
2-Furylglyoxylic acid
3-Furylglyoxylic acid

See also 
 Hydroxybenzoquinone